Orange is the soundtrack to the 2010 Indian Telugu-language romantic film of the same name, directed by Bhaskar and starring Ram Charan, Genelia D'Souza and Shazahn Padamsee. The soundtrack album includes six tracks composed by Harris Jayaraj marking his first collaboration with Bhaskar and Ram Charan. The album was released on 25 October 2010, at a promotional event held at Shilpakala Vedika in Hyderabad, and was marketed by the Aditya Music label. The audio of its Tamil dubbed version Ram Charan was launched at 4 Frames Theater in Chennai on 7 November 2012. The soundtrack album released to highly positive reviews and gained critical acclaim. It became one of the highest rated music albums in Telugu cinema. The album was positively received and was nominated at major award ceremonies.

Release

Telugu version
The audio was initially planned to be launched on 14 August 2010. However, the audio was launched on 10 September 2010 at Shilpakala Vedika in Hyderabad. The function was attended by Chiranjeevi, D. Rama Naidu, Kovelamudi Raghavendra Rao, Nagendra Babu, Bhaskar, Allu Arjun, Rana Daggubati, Sai Dharam Tej, Harris Jayaraj, Anand Sai, V. V. Vinayak, Boyapati Seenu, Allu Aravind, K. S. Rama Rao, K. L. Narayana, Bhogavalli Prasad, D Danayya, Gemini Kiran, Paruchuri Venkateswara Rao, Brahmanandam, Ali, Venu Madhav etc. attended it. However Ram Charan and Genelia D'Souza missed the event as they were shooting for a song in Australia.

Tamil version
The audio launch function of the Tamil version was held on 7 November 2012 at the 4 Frames Theatre in Chennai. Singer Devan Ekambaram, Lyricist Arivumathi, Viveka, Jayamurasu, Yugabharathi, Arun Bharathi graced the event.

Production 
Harris Jayaraj began working on this film from late October of 2009 onwards. Before working on this film, Harris Jayaraj composed music for the delayed film Engeyum Kadhal, and the song "Dhimu Dhimu" that was finished in December of 2009 was used in this film as "Chilipiga Chusthavala". The songs "O Range" and "Oola Oolala Ala" were shot in Australia. The song "Rooba Rooba" was initially supposed to be pictured on Genelia D'Souza, but after Ram Charan's suggestion that Genelia's homely nature would not work well, Shazahn Padamsee was featured. Vanamali felt that writing lyrics for "Nenu Nuvvantu" was tough because "Bhaskar wanted to convey the feel with simple words that fit into Harris Jayaraj's tune".

Track listing

Telugu

Tamil

Reception
The audio received positive response. Musicperk.com gave a review stating "Harris Jayaraj has composed an urban product that will surely strike a chord with the youth...Almost all songs are great" and rated the film 3.5/5. Milliblog.com gave a review stating "Harris’ return, after an year, seems deliberately safe." IndiaGlitz gave a review stating "Orange, may be a fruit but as a colour, it is quite vibrant just as this album is. Harris Jayaraj has composed an urban product that will surely strike a chord with the youth! Almost all songs are great with 'Nenu Nuvvantu' standing out." raagalahari.com gave a review stating "Orange has its good and also has its not so good, just like the sweet-sour taste of orange fruit. The album starts off great and drags towards the end. Regardless, this album is being widely accepted due to Ram Charan’s reputation and the marketing of the film will further ensure the high sales of the music album." Cinecorn.com gave a review stating "At the end the album not just satisfies the expectations stated at the beginning, it goes even beyond it. Hence we get an album that's not just for the sake of commercial prospects but something that can be heard for some years to come. An album with excellent melody coupled with beautiful lyrics, always have a timeless appeal...as off today it stays with you long after you have finished listening" and rated the album 4/5. SuperGoodMovies gave a review stating "On a whole, Orange is an out and out classy album and is seriously addictive for music lovers..Harris have a winner on hands."

The audio was an instant success, with a record amount of Sales in the market. Aditya Gupta of Aditya Music expressed his happiness over it to the media speaking "My special thanks to Chiranjeevi garu, Allu Aravind garu, Nagababu garu and their family members for offering us the music rights with great trust...the music of ‘Orange’ composed by Harris Jayaraj is widely being received by the music movie buffs, especially in the form of iTunes, Apple Store, Nokia Stores, etc."

Awards and nominations

References

2010 soundtrack albums
Romance film soundtracks
Telugu film soundtracks
Harris Jayaraj albums
Aditya Music soundtracks